The  is a railway line in Kyoto, Japan, operated by private railway operator Hankyu Railway. It connects Katsura and Arashiyama on the west side of the city, linking the area along the line to the Hankyu Kyoto Main Line that extends east to central Kyoto and south to Osaka.
The line is 4.1 km long.

Trains on the line mainly use 4-car Hankyu 6300 series electric multiple unit trains, which were originally built for limited express services on the main line from 1975 and refurbished for Arashiyama Line services from 2009.

History
The line opened as 1435mm gauge dual track electrified at 1500 VDC in November 1928.

One line of the dual track was removed in 1944 for metal collection as part of the Japanese war effort. Crossing loops at both intermediate stations were built in 1950.

Stations

All four stations on the line are in Nishikyo-ku, Kyoto. While the entire line is single track, both the intermediate stations are equipped with crossing loops.

References
This article incorporates material from the corresponding article in the Japanese Wikipedia

Arashiyama Line
Arashiyama Line
Rail transport in Kyoto Prefecture
Standard gauge railways in Japan
Railway lines opened in 1928